Municipal elections were held in Belize on 3 March 2021. Voters elected a total 67 representatives. This includes a mayor in each of the nine communities, 42 town councils and 16 city councillors (ten in Belize City and six in Belmopan). This election saw another historic consecutive landslide victory for the People's United Party which won all 9 municipalities and 65 of the 67 municipal seats with the United Democratic Party (UDP) losing 38 municipal seats and only managing to hold on to two. This election took place a few months after the PUP's historic 2020 Belizean general election victory.

In 2018, the UDP won 41 seats, with the PUP picking up the remaining 26. The PUP gained complete council control of Belize City and Corozal Town, picked up a council seat in Dangriga, and regained complete control of the Orange Walk Town council.

Participating parties 
The following parties contested the election:

 United Democratic Party
 People's United Party
 Belize Progressive Party
 Belize People's Front
 United Upliftment Party

Results

Belize City

Belmopan

Towns 

 Benque Viejo del Carmen: PUP wins town council 6-0.
 Corozal Town: PUP wins town council 6-0.
 Dangriga: PUP wins town council 6-0.
 Orange Walk Town: PUP wins town council 6-0.
 Punta Gorda: PUP wins town council 6-0.
 San Ignacio/Santa Elena: PUP wins town council 4-2.
 San Pedro Town: PUP wins town council 6-0.

References 

2021 elections in Central America
2021 elections in the Caribbean
Municipal elections
2021